Quaid-i-Millat or "Leader of the Country or Nation" may refer to,
 Liaquat Ali Khan (1895—1951), first prime minister of Pakistan 
 M. Muhammad Ismail (1896—1972), the founder of Indian Union Muslim League